Izmail Sea Commercial Port, a state-owned enterprise in the field of maritime transport, is a multidisciplinary port located in the waters of the Kiliia River estuary of the Danube. It reports to the Ministry of Infrastructure (Ukraine). It is an important transport hub of Ukraine. According to the Law of Ukraine "On Seaports of Ukraine," the functions of the seaport administration are performed by the Izmail branch of the state enterprise of the Ukrainian Sea Ports Authority (AMPU). The number of employees at Port of Izmail as of 2009 was 2,520 people.

Gallery

See also
List of ports in Ukraine
Transport in Ukraine

References

Danube
19th-century establishments in Ukraine
Transport in Izmail Raion
Izmail
Buildings and structures in Odesa Oblast
Ports of Odesa Oblast
Ukrainian Sea Ports Authority